Danielle Posthuma (born 17 January 1972) is a Dutch behavior and psychiatric geneticist who specializes in statistical genetics. She is a University Research Chair professor at VU University Amsterdam, where she is also head of the Department of Complex Trait Genetics. She has been a member of the Young Academy of the Royal Dutch Academy of Sciences since 2005. She is known for studying the genetics of psychiatric and cognitive traits, including schizophrenia, neuroticism, Alzheimer's disease, insomnia, as well as genetics of intelligence, which she first became interested in researching in the 1990s. In 2019 Posthuma became a member of the Royal Netherlands Academy of Arts and Sciences.

References

External links
Faculty profile

Dutch geneticists
Statistical geneticists
Vrije Universiteit Amsterdam alumni
Academic staff of Vrije Universiteit Amsterdam
Intelligence researchers
Living people
Behavior geneticists
Members of the Royal Netherlands Academy of Arts and Sciences
1972 births